With All My Heart is the sixth studio album and debut English-language album by the pop/opera vocal quartet Romanz.

Background 
It was released by Select Music in October 2012. One single was released: "My Angel"

Track listing
 "With All My Heart"
 "My Angel" 
 "New World"
 "Dammi Le Ali"
 "Solitaire"
 "I’m Going To Spend My Lifetime Loving You"
 "I Know It Now"
 "Remember Me"
 "You Got It"
 "Vicino A Me"
 "Bridge Over Troubled Water"
 "African Dream"

References 
http://myfreemp3.eu/music/Romanz+My+angel

External links 
 Official Website 

2013 albums
Pop rock albums by English artists
Romanz albums